Interamnium – also Interamna – is an ancient Latin placename, meaning "between rivers", and may refer to:

 Interamna Lirinas, no modern successor, on the Liri River
 Interamna Nahars (or Nahartium), the modern Terni; the rivers are the Nera and the Tiber
 Interamna Praetutiana (or Interamna Praetutianorum), the modern Teramo; the rivers are the Tordino and the Vezzola
 Interamnium, Calabria, near Sezzano Albanese; at the junction of the Coscile and Esaro rivers
 Interamnium Flavium, probably in Bembibre (Motto: Interamnium Flavium); the rivers are the Boeza and the Noceda
 704 Interamnia, an asteroid named after the town of Teramo

See also
 Interamnia (disambiguation)